Golden Kamuy is a Japanese anime series based on the manga of the same name  written and illustrated by Satoru Noda. The anime television series adaptation is produced by Geno Studio. It is directed by Hitoshi Nanba and written by Noboru Takagi, with music by Kenichiro Suehiro, art direction by Atsushi Morikawa, and CG direction by Yuuko Okumura and Yasutaka Hamada. Kenichi Ohnuki is adapting the character designs for animation, while Koji Watanabe designs firearms, Shinya Anasuma designs the props, and Ryō Sumiyoshi designs the animals. Like with the manga, Hiroshi Nakagawa, an Ainu language linguist from Chiba University, works on the anime as an Ainu language supervisor. The first season aired from April 9, 2018 to June 25, 2018 on Tokyo MX, ytv, STV, and BS11. A second season aired from October 8, 2018 to December 24, 2018. A third season has been announced and aired from October 5 to December 21, 2020. A fourth season has been announced. Brain's Base is producing the season, replacing Geno Studio. Shizutaka Sugahara is serving as the chief director, and Takumi Yamakawa is designing the characters. Noboru Takagi is returning to write the scripts.  The season is set to premiere on October 3, 2022.

Four original video animations (OVAs) have been produced. The first, based on the manga's "Barato" arc, was released on DVD in a bundle with the manga's 15th Japanese volume on September 19, 2018. The second was released with the manga's 17th Japanese volume on March 19, 2019. The third, based on the "Monster" arc, was released with the manga's 19th Japanese volume on September 19, 2019. The fourth, based on the "Shiton Animal Record" arc, was bundled with the 23rd manga volume on September 18, 2020. Golden Dōga Gekijō is a series of 25-second long animated shorts directed by Kenshirō Morii and produced by DMM.futureworks and W-Toon Studio, that premiered on YouTube on April 16, 2018.

Series overview

Episode list

Season 1 (2018)

Season 2 (2018)

Season 3 (2020)

Season 4 (2022)

OVAs

Special episodes

Golden Dōga Gekijō

Season 1 (2018)

Season 2 (2018)

Season 3 (2020)

Notes

References

External links
  
 
 

Golden Kamuy
Golden Kamuy episode lists